Guillermo Adrian Miguel Söhnlein (born May 18, 1966 in Buenos Aires, Argentina) is an American social entrepreneur with special interests in the commercialization of outer space, the exploration of the world's oceans, and the global connections between space and ocean industries.

Personal life
Guillermo Söhnlein was born in Buenos Aires, Argentina, on May 18, 1966. He immigrated to the United States in 1972 with his family, where they settled in San Jose, California. He attended St. Francis High School in Mountain View. He became a naturalized citizen of the United States in 1986.  He graduated in December 1989 from the University of California at Berkeley with an A.B. in economics. In May 1995 he earned a J.D. from the University of California Hastings College of the Law in San Francisco, where he was Editor-in-Chief of the West-Northwest Journal of Environmental Law and Policy 

From 1995 to 1999, he served  in the United States Marine Corps, achieving the rank of Captain. 

He has three children: Rebecca Lynn Söhnlein (b January 30, 1999), Daniel Jacob Söhnlein (b. March 20, 2001), and Caleb Miguel Söhnlein (b. March 1, 2005).

In 2011, Söhnlein was accepted as a Fellow of Opus Novum, a group committed to professional conduct guided by Seven Principles and to the notion that global problems can be resolved only through cooperation among nonprofit, for-profit, and government partners. In 2012, he was accepted as a member of The Explorers Club.

Professional career 

In 1998, Söhnlein co-founded Milo, a speech recognition technology  company that was acquired by Voxeo in 2001.

After relocating to the Northern Virginia region outside Washington, D.C., he worked with a number of technology startup ventures, and advised several technology-related investment groups, incubators, and economic development agencies,  and gave frequent talks about the field.

In 2009, he co-founded  iSpaces, which developed a cloud-based operating system and suite of applications.  After two years of development, its public beta release went live in 2012.

Space commercialization ventures 

In 2003, Söhnlein founded the International Association of Space Entrepreneurs (IASE), which is a nonprofit organization created to encourage successful entrepreneurs from other industries to start aerospace-related ventures and start-ups.  The group grew from 5 people to almost 1,500 individuals around the world.  In 2010, the online community was transferred to the Space Frontier Foundation for ongoing growth, and IASE officially disbanded.

In 2006, he founded Space Angels Network, a for-profit angel investor group  for early-stage aerospace ventures.  Founding members included Esther Dyson, Stephen Fleming, David S. Rose, and Ed Tuck. In April 2007, Burton Lee joined as co-founder, and the two led the group's Aerospace Venture Forums showcasing entrepreneurial ventures for prospective investors. In 2010, Joe Landon took over as managing director, and under his leadership the group announced its first four investment deals during 2011-2012.  As of early 2013, the group consisted of approximately 30 investor members living across the United States and Europe and more than 100 young companies that had applied for funding.

Ocean exploration ventures 

In 2009, Söhnlein co-founded OceanGate, Inc., a venture that provides deep-sea manned submersibles. It  owns and operates Antipodes (submarine), a five-person manned submersible with a depth rating of 305 meters (1,000 feet) and twin 58" hemispherical acrylic domes fore and aft on its cylindrical hull. During 2010-2012, he helped organize five submarine exploration expeditions to Santa Catalina Island in California, Puget Sound in Washington, Monterey Bay (twice) in California, and Miami in Florida.

In 2010, he re-launched the Ocean Exploration Committee of the Marine Technology Society, a nonprofit membership association supporting students and industry professionals in  marine-related fields.

In 2011, he co-founded the  OceanGate Foundation, now ExploreOcean, a nonprofit organization that conducts outreach programs on about manned submersibles. During October 2011, it conducted a program in Monterey, California, that reached almost 2,000 local students, teachers, and community leaders. During March 2012, it conducted a 10-day educational program in Miami, Florida.  Over 1,000 students participated in the program's  presentations and submarine tours.

In 2013, he founded Blue Marble Exploration, which organized high-profile expeditions to explore the oceans in manned submersibles. These expeditions were intended to push the limits of technology, science, operations, and human endurance in order to raise public awareness of the world's oceans.

Sea-Space Connections 

In 2011, he founded the Sea-Space Initiative, a global project to provide collaboration in ocean and space industries. The first program, launched in May 2012, is the Sea-Space Summit, a global series of invitation-only workshops.

References

External links 
 www.bluemarbleexploration.com
 www.ifest.info
 www.ispaces.com
 www.oceangatefoundation.org
 www.opentheoceans.com
 www.opusnovum.org
 www.seaspaceinitiative.org
 www.spaceangelsnetwork.com
 www.uchastings.edu/wnw

1966 births
People from Buenos Aires
Living people
Argentine emigrants to the United States
American technology company founders
American investors
Businesspeople from San Jose, California
University of California, Berkeley alumni
University of California, Hastings College of the Law alumni
American social entrepreneurs